Jaures Maudsly Ngombe (born 22 May 1998) is a Congolese footballer currently playing for Congolese club AS Otohô in the Congo Premier League.

International career
Ngombe made his international debut for Congo on August 11, 2017 during a 2018 African Nations Championship qualification match against DR Congo.

Career statistics

International

International goals
Scores and results list Congo's goal tally first.

References

External links
Jaures Ngombe at Footballdatabase

Living people
1998 births
Republic of the Congo footballers
Republic of the Congo expatriate footballers
Republic of the Congo international footballers
Association football forwards
Étoile du Congo players
AS Otôho players
Republic of the Congo expatriate sportspeople in Tunisia
Expatriate footballers in Tunisia
CS Sfaxien players
Republic of the Congo A' international footballers
2018 African Nations Championship players
2020 African Nations Championship players